Freimanis (feminine: Freimane) is a Latvian surname of German origin (from German surname Freimann). Individuals with the surname include:

 Andrejs Freimanis (1914–1994), Latvian SS officer awarded the Knight's Cross of the Iron Cross
 Eduards Freimanis (1919–1993), Latvian football player
 Mārtiņš Freimanis (1977–2011), Latvian musician
 Rolands Freimanis (born 1988), Latvian basketball player

Latvian-language masculine surnames